Seyyed Mohammadlu (also Romanized as Seyyed Moḩammadlū; also known as Seyyed Moḩammadī) is a village in Angut-e Gharbi Rural District, Anguti District, Germi County, Ardabil Province, Iran. At the 2006 census, its population was 100, in 21 families.

References 

Towns and villages in Germi County